George Sharpe Duryee (July 15, 1850 – October 28, 1896) was a lawyer who served as United States Attorney for the District of New Jersey under President Cleveland. In addition he served as a member of the New Jersey State Assembly.

Biography
George Sharpe Duryee was born in Newark, New Jersey to Peter Sharpe Duryee and Susan Rankin Duryee in 1850. He graduated Rutgers College in 1872 and admitted to the New Jersey Bar in 1875. He was prominent New Jersey lawyer for McCarter and Keene and served as a member of the New Jersey Assembly, from 1877 to 1881. In 1881 Governor Ludlow appointed him to the position of clerk at the Court of Chancery for New Jersey, a role he held until 1886. He was an alderman of Newark's fourth ward. In 1888 President Cleveland appointed him to become the United States Attorney for the District of New Jersey a role he served until his resignation in 1890. After which time he was appointed the state commissioner of insurance and banking under Governor Abbett and he was retained in that position by Governor Werts, and held this position until his death in 1896.

References

1850 births
1896 deaths
19th-century American politicians
19th-century American lawyers
Politicians from Newark, New Jersey
United States Attorneys for the District of New Jersey
New Jersey lawyers
Democratic Party members of the New Jersey General Assembly
Rutgers University alumni